Clayton Sinnot Adams (December 7, 1881 in Champaign, Illinois – April 6, 1965) was an Adjutant General and Brigadier General during World War II.

Military career 
Adams was commissioned in the infantry reserves at Fort Sheridan in 1917. He was called to active duty in September, 1940. Adams served in the Adjutant General's office from 1940 to 1942. In 1942, Adams became a Brigadier General. From 1942 to 1943, he served as the Head of the Army Postal Service. From December 1943 to July 1944, Adams was assigned to the Army Service Forces.

Awards
Adams received the Legion of Merit.

Death and legacy
Adams died on April 4, 1965 and is buried in Arlington National Cemetery.

References

External links

United States Army Officers 1939−1945
Generals of World War II

1881 births
1965 deaths
United States Army generals
People from Champaign, Illinois
Recipients of the Legion of Merit
United States Army personnel of World War I
United States Army generals of World War II
Burials at Arlington National Cemetery
Military personnel from Illinois